Sergey Stas (born 28 April 1974) is a Belarusian ice hockey player. He competed in the men's tournaments at the 1998 Winter Olympics and the 2002 Winter Olympics.

Career statistics

Regular season and playoffs

International

References

External links
 

1974 births
Living people
Olympic ice hockey players of Belarus
Ice hockey players at the 1998 Winter Olympics
Ice hockey players at the 2002 Winter Olympics
Ice hockey people from Minsk
Belarusian expatriate sportspeople in Germany
Belarusian expatriate sportspeople in the United States
HC Dinamo Minsk players
Erie Panthers players
Saginaw Lumber Kings players
Quad City Mallards (CoHL) players
Phoenix Roadrunners (IHL) players
Greensboro Monarchs players
Las Vegas Thunder players
San Antonio Dragons players
New Jersey Rockin' Rollers players
Portland Rage players
Sacramento River Rats players
Nürnberg Ice Tigers players
Krefeld Pinguine players
Augsburger Panther players
EHC Freiburg players
Belarusian ice hockey defencemen
Soviet ice hockey defencemen
Belarusian expatriate sportspeople in Canada
Belarusian expatriate ice hockey people
Expatriate ice hockey players in the United States
Expatriate ice hockey players in Canada
Expatriate ice hockey players in Germany